Neocogniauxia is a genus of orchids, (family Orchidaceae), consisting of two species in the Greater Antilles. The genus is named for botanist Alfred Cogniaux.

Species

References 

 Nir, M. Orchidaceae Antillanae, 252–253, 2000

External links 

Pleurothallidinae
Flora of the Caribbean
Pleurothallidinae genera